Pavel Pevný (born 14 July 1958) is a Czech rower. He competed in the men's eight event at the 1980 Summer Olympics.

References

External links
 

1958 births
Living people
Czech male rowers
Olympic rowers of Czechoslovakia
Rowers at the 1980 Summer Olympics
Sportspeople from Brno